Văn Yên District is former district of Hải Hưng Province. It was formed on March 11, 1977, from merger of Văn Giang and Yên Mỹ districts. It was merged on February 2, 1979, with Văn Mỹ district to form Mỹ Văn district.

References 

Former districts of Vietnam